East Peak is a  glaciated mountain summit located in the Chugach Mountains, in the U.S. state of Alaska. Although modest in elevation, relief is significant since the western aspect of the mountain rises up from tidewater of Prince William Sound in approximately six miles. The mountain received its descriptive name in 1898 from Captain William R. Abercrombie, who led an 1898 expedition seeking a route from coastal Alaska to the Klondike.

Climate

Based on the Köppen climate classification, East Peak is located in a subarctic climate zone with long, cold, snowy winters, and mild summers. Weather fronts coming off the Gulf of Alaska are forced upwards by the Chugach Mountains (orographic lift), causing heavy precipitation in the form of rainfall and snowfall. Temperatures can drop below −20 °C with wind chill factors below −30 °C. This climate supports the Rubin, Keystone, and Camicia Glaciers, as well as smaller unnamed hanging glaciers surrounding the mountain.

See also

List of mountain peaks of Alaska
Geography of Alaska

References

External links
 Weather forecast: East Peak
 East Peak: YouTube
 Skiing video East Peak: Vimeo

Mountains of Alaska
Landforms of Chugach Census Area, Alaska
North American 2000 m summits